Krates   is a 1913 Dutch silent drama film directed by Louis H. Chrispijn.

Cast
 Cor Laurentius	... 	Jonge Theodoor Makko / Krates / Young Theodoor Makko / Krates
 Charles Gilhuys	... 	Oudere Theodoor Makko / Krates / Elderly Theodoor Makko / Krates
 Eugenie Krix	... 	Juffrouw Ram / miss Ram
 Gerard Pilger Sr.	... 	Philip Strijkman
 Willem Hunsche	... 	Löbell
 Mientje Kling	... 	Augusta Tournel
 Jan van Dommelen	... 	Signor Carlo
 Alex Benno		
 Louis Chrispijn Jr.		
 Christine van Meeteren		
 Gerard Pilger Jr.

References

External links 
 

1913 films
Dutch silent short films
Dutch black-and-white films
1913 drama films
Films directed by Louis H. Chrispijn
Dutch drama films
Silent drama films